Wang Ke (born August 31, 1983 in Qingdao) is a Chinese football player who currently plays for China League Two side Jilin Baijia.

Club career

Shanghai Shenhua
Wang Ke began his career with Shanghai Shenhua playing for the youth team and graduated to the senior team in 2000. During his time with the youth team he was selected to play in São Paulo football club youth team and was teammates with Kaka. While at Shanghai Shenhua he spent several seasons gradually establishing himself as a regular within the team and would even win the 2003 league title with the team. Unfortunately in 2013 the Chinese Football Association would revoke the league title after it was discovered the Shenhua General manager Lou Shifang had bribed officials to be bias to Shenhua in games that season. While he spent several further seasons with the team he would struggle to establish himself as a first team starter and after eight seasons he was allowed to leave the club.

Beijing Guoan
He was transferred to Beijing Guoan at the beginning of the 2008 league season for a fee of 1,400,000 RMB. As with Shanghai Shenhua and despite being predominantly a right midfielder he spent much of his time as a substitute where he has come in to play a variety of midfield positions. While this would see him be part of the squad that went on to win the 2009 Chinese Super League title, Wang never went further than being a squad player within the team and was released at the end of the 2010 league campaign.

Honours
Shanghai Shenhua
Chinese Jia-A League: 2003 (revoked due to match-fixing scandal)

Beijing Guoan
Chinese Super League: 2009

References

External links
Player profile at Sina.com
Player profile at Sodasoccer.com
Player stats at football-lineups website
Player stats at Sohu.com

1983 births
Living people
Association football midfielders
Chinese footballers
Footballers from Qingdao
Shanghai Shenhua F.C. players
Beijing Guoan F.C. players
Chinese Super League players